Nymphotomy is the surgical procedure of incision into the labia minora. Surgical removal of the labia minora is called nymphectomy. In plastic surgery, the term labiaplasty, which describes plastic surgery of the labia (often in the form of labia minora reduction) is now more commonly used.

The term nymphectomy is also used to describe removal of parts of the labia as part of female genital cutting.

References 
 Giraldo F, Gonzalez C, de Haro F. Central wedge nymphectomy with a 90-degree Z-plasty for aesthetic reduction of the labia minora. Plast Reconstr Surg. 2004 May;113(6):1820-5; discussion 1826–7. 
 Mary Knight. Curing Cut or Ritual Mutilation?: Some Remarks on the Practice of Female and Male Circumcision in Graeco-Roman Egypt. Isis, Vol. 92, No. 2 (Jun., 2001), pp. 317–338  

Gynecological surgery